Sialidase-3 is an enzyme that in humans is encoded by the NEU3 gene.

Function 

This gene product belongs to a family of glycohydrolytic enzymes which remove sialic acid residues from glycoproteins and glycolipids. It is localized in the plasma membrane, and its activity is specific for gangliosides. It may play a role in modulating the ganglioside content of the lipid bilayer.

Interactions 
Sialidase-3 has been shown to interact with Grb2.

References

Further reading 

 
 
 
 
 
 
 
 
 
 
 
 
 
 
 
 
 
 

Human proteins